In mathematics, the free category or path category generated by a directed graph or quiver is the category that results from freely concatenating arrows together, whenever the target of one arrow is the source of the next.

More precisely, the objects of the category are the vertices of the quiver, and the morphisms are paths between objects. Here, a path is defined as a finite sequence

where  is a vertex of the quiver,  is an edge of the quiver, and n ranges over the non-negative integers. For every vertex  of the quiver, there is an "empty path" which constitutes the identity morphisms of the category.

The composition operation is concatenation of paths. Given paths

their composition is
.

Note that the result of the composition starts with the right operand of the composition, and ends with its left operand.

Examples 

Properties
The category of small categories Cat has a forgetful functor  into the quiver category Quiv:

 : Cat → Quiv

which takes objects to vertices and morphisms to arrows. Intuitively,  "[forgets] which arrows are composites and which are identities". This forgetful functor is right adjoint to the functor sending a quiver to the corresponding free category.

Universal property

The free category on a quiver can be described up to isomorphism by a universal property. Let  : Quiv → Cat be the functor that takes a quiver to the free category on that quiver (as described above), let  be the forgetful functor defined above, and let  be any quiver. Then there is a graph homomorphism  :  → (()) and given any category D and any graph homomorphism  :  → , there is a unique functor  : → D such that∘=, i.e. the following diagram commutes:

The functor  is left adjoint to the forgetful functor .

See also

 Free strict monoidal category
 Free object
 Adjoint functors

References

Free algebraic structures